Bodington is a surname. Notable people with the surname include:

Alice Brooke Bodington (1840–1897), British science writer
Bob Bodington (1894–1976), Australian rules footballer
Cecil Bodington (1880–1917), English cricketer
David Bodington (born 1947), British speed skater
Eric Bodington (1862–1929), British Anglican priest and author, Archdeacon of Wilts 1912 to 1927
George Bodington (1799–1882), British physician
Nathan Bodington (1848–1911), English classical scholar
Nicolas Bodington (1904–1974), British intelligence operative
Oliver Bodington (1859–1936), English barrister

See also
Boddington (disambiguation)